"Economic Party" may also refer to the Reich Party of the German Middle Class, the Independent Economic Party (Kenya) or the Economic Party (Italy).

The Economic Party was a political party in South West Africa. It was initially formed on 27 August 1925 as the Omaruru Political Society by S. Proctor.

References

Defunct political parties in Namibia
Political parties established in 1925
1925 establishments in South West Africa